The Vale Drug Store is a building located in Vale, Oregon listed on the National Register of Historic Places.

See also
 National Register of Historic Places listings in Malheur County, Oregon

References

Buildings and structures in Malheur County, Oregon
National Register of Historic Places in Malheur County, Oregon
Vale, Oregon
1907 establishments in Oregon
Commercial buildings completed in 1907